Castle Tump was a castle in the village of Dymock in Gloucestershire, England.

The castle was built in either the 11th or more probably the early 12th century as a motte and bailey design. The motte today is 14 m high, with the traces of the bailey to the south-east.

During the Anarchy the castle was given to William de Braose, the son-in-law of the powerful Miles de Gloucester. After the conflict the castle is believed to have probably been destroyed by Henry II as part of a wider programme of castle denigration in Gloucestershire during the 1150s.

See also
 Castles in Great Britain and Ireland
 List of castles in England

References

Bibliography
Amt, Emilie. (1993) The Accession of Henry II in England: royal government restored, 1149-1159. Woodbridge, UK: Boydell Press. .
Fry, Plantagenet Somerset. (2005) Castles: England, Scotland, Wales, Ireland: the definitive guide to the most impressive buildings and intriguing sites. Cincinnati: David and Charles. .
Renn, Derek Frank. (1968) Norman castles in Britain. London: Baker.

Castles in Gloucestershire